La Gi (pronounced:/la-yi/) is a District-level town (thị xã) of Bình Thuận province, Vietnam. Under the Republic of Vietnam period, La Gi was the provincial capital of Bình Tuy province (present-day western Bình Thuận Province). After the Vietnam War, it became the capital of Hàm Tân District. It was established in 2005 with the split of La Gi away from Hàm Tân District.

La Gi borders with Hàm Tân District in the north and west, Hàm Thuận Nam District in the east and the South China Sea in the south. It is subdivided into 5 wards: Tân An, Phước Hội, Phước Lộc, Tân Thiện and Bình Tân, and 4 communes: Tân Phước, Tân Tiến, Tân Hải and Tân Bình.

It is on the coastal road from Bình Châu via Lộc An beach to Phước Hải, Đất Đỏ.

References

Districts of Bình Thuận province
County-level towns in Vietnam